Napareuli may refer to:

 Napareuli, Telavi, a village in Telavi municipality, Georgia
 Napareuli (wine), a Georgian wine